Douliu (Hokkien POJ: Táu-la̍k) is a county-administered city and the county seat of Yunlin County, Taiwan. It is also the political and economic center of the county. Douliu City is served by National Highway No. 3.

Name
Its former name came from a language of the Hoanya people, a tribe of the Taiwanese plains aborigines.

History

Empire of Japan

In 1901, during Japanese rule,  was one of twenty local administrative offices established. In 1920,  was established and governed under , Tainan Prefecture. Toroku Town covered modern-day Douliu and Linnei Township.

Republic of China

On 25 December 1981, Douliu was upgraded from an urban township to county-administered city.

Administrative divisions
Xinyi, Siwei, Taiping, Zhonghe, Guangxing, Zengxi, Zengtung, Sanping, Mingde, Zengbei, Gongcheng, Zhongxiao, Renai, Bade, Gongzheng, Zhongguang, Lintou, Chenggong, Zengnan, Shekou, Longtan, Jiatung, Lunfeng, Gouju, Jiangcuo, Sanguang, Jiuan, Huxi, Baozhuang, Zhangping, Liuzhong, Liubei, Liunan, Meilin, Hushan, Zhangan, Xizhou and Shisan Village.

Government institutions
 Yunlin County Government
 Yunlin County Council

Economy
Douliu is home to the Douliu Industrial Park and the Yunlin Science Industrial Park.

Health
 National Taiwan University Hospital Yunlin Branch
 Cheng Kung Hospital Douliu Branch
 Tzu Chi Douliu Clinic
 Hongyang General Hospital洪揚醫院

Places of interest
Taiping Street: An old street featuring Japanese-era baroque buildings from three different periods. The street is a common location for special events and performing arts venues.
Renwen Park & Sports Ground:  (運動公園及人文公園) Located across from the National Yunlin University of Science and Technology, the park includes a skating rink, trails, etc. It serves as a public transportation, sports, and entertainment venue. It is also a common tourist destination during major festivals.
Douliu Roundabout: Also called "Douliu Door", it is a landmark of Yunlin County. Water shows occur every evening with music.
Yukihiro Memorial: In 1915 during Japanese rule, Crown Prince Hirohito (the future Emperor Showa) came to inspect the construction of public buildings. The area has been developed into a public space and community activity center.
Toroku POW Camp Memorial: A memorial stone located at the Gouba Elementary School. It preserves the memory of POWs of the Japanese during World War II.
Renwen Park Night Market: Located next to Renwen Park, a temporary night market sets up on Saturdays.
Taiwan Temple Art Museum: (台灣寺廟藝術館)
 House of Citizen-Memorial Hall of Attendance
 Hushan Dam

Festivals
 Yunlin Orange Culture Festival (雲林柳橙文化節)
 Pomelo Carnival (文旦嘉年華會) 
 The Beigang International Music Festival (北港國際音樂文化藝術節) hosts music performances in the Yulin County Concert Hall in Douliu during every festival.

Sports
Douliu Baseball Stadium occasionally holds regular CPBL games and was also the venue for 2007 Baseball World Cup and Baseball at the 2008 Summer Olympics' Final Qualifying Tournament.

Education

 National Yunlin University of Science and Technology
 TransWorld University

Notable natives
 Liu Chien-kuo, member of Legislative Yuan

Transportation

Rail
Taiwan Railway Administration
Shiliu Station
Douliu Station

Bus
Taisi Bus: http://www.taisibus.com/index.php?option=com_productbook&Itemid=61

Solar Bus: http://www.solarbus.com.tw/

Road
National Highway No. 3
Provincial Highway No. 78
Provincial Highway No. 1
Provincial Highway No. 3
County Highway No. 154

References

External links

 Douliu City Office

1981 establishments in Taiwan
County-administered cities of Taiwan
Populated places in Yunlin County